The 2014 FIBA Asia Under-18 Championship is the 23rd edition of the FIBA Asia's youth championship for basketball. The games were held at Doha, Qatar on August 19–28, 2014.

Qualification

According to the FIBA Asia rules, the number of participating teams in the FIBA Asia Under-18 Championship is sixteen. Each of the six FIBA Asia Sub-Zones had two places, and the hosts (Qatar) and holders (China) were automatically qualified. The other four places are allocated to the zones according to performance in the 2012 FIBA Asia Under-18 Championship.

Allocation

Teams 

* Only 5 teams registered from East Asia.

Draw
The draw and schedule of games for the preliminary round competition has been announced. Al-Gharafa Stadium was named as the main venue for the duration of the tournament, with six out of eight games will be played there. The FIBA Boys' World Ranking are shown within the parenthesis.
*withdraw

Preliminary round

Group A

|}

Group B

|}

Group C

|}

Group D

|}

Second round

Group E

|}

Group F

|}

Classification 9th–12th

Semifinals

11th place

9th place

Final round

Quarterfinals

Semifinals 5th–8th

Semifinals

7th place

5th place

Battle-for-Third

Final

Final standing

References

 
FIBA Asia Under-18 Championship
2014–15 in Asian basketball
2014 in Qatari sport
International basketball competitions hosted by Qatar
August 2014 sports events in Asia